Xuanwu or Xuan Wu may refer to:

Mythology
Black Tortoise or Turtle, one of the Four Symbols of Chinese astronomy
Xuanwu (god) ("Dark Warrior"), a god in Chinese religion

People
Emperor Xuanwu of Northern Wei

Geography
Xuanwu District, Beijing, China
Xuanwu District, Nanjing, Jiangsu, China
Xuanwu Lake in Nanjing, China
Xuanwu, Luyi County, a town in Luyi County, Henan, in China